Porthcawl Lifeboat Station (based in Porthcawl, Bridgend, Wales) opened in 1860 and a boathouse was subsequently built on the promenade to house the lifeboat. This station was closed in 1902 when Porthcawl Dock was closed.

The station reopened in 1965 as an Inshore Lifeboat Station with a  lifeboat. The current boathouse was built in 1996 to house a new  lifeboat which now houses an  lifeboat.

History
The station opened in April 1860, with the boathouse being built on the promenade, at the entrance to Knights Arms Square.

In 1870, a new lifeboat was bought for the station which required the existing boathouse to be enlarged. A harness room was also included to store equipment for the six horses needed to launch and recover the lifeboat.

In 1887 the station received another new lifeboat. This was used very little with only 9 launches until the station closed in 1902.

Porthcawl Lifeboat Station was closed in 1902 due to the cessation of commercial traffic to the Docks. Since the majority of the stations launches were for commercial traffic, it was deemed unnecessary to have a lifeboat station and the boathouse was sold.

In 1965, the RNLI re-opened the station and placed on service an experimental inflatable inshore lifeboat. This lifeboat was the first D class, designed to give a rapid response to recreational water users around the coast.

Due to the RNLI selling the old boathouse, the new lifeboat was housed in a lean-to next to Jennings building and the crew were recruited using adverts in the local press.

In 1995, the stations lifeboat rescued a windsurfer in a force 10 gale which resulted in a silver medal being awarded to the helmsman

In 1996 the RNLI decided that Porthcawl needed a larger boat and a new, purpose built boathouse was constructed to house a brand new Atlantic 75 and a new Talus MB-4H Tractor launch tractor together with a Do-Do carriage.

Fleet

All Weather Boats

Inshore Lifeboats

D-class

B-class

Station Honours
The following are among the RNLI medals and other awards presented for service off Porthcawl:

Silver Medals x 8 – pre 1860
Eight Silver Medals were awarded for rescues off the coast prior to an official RNLI station opening in Porthcawl in 1860.

Bronze Medal – 1929
A Bronze Medal was awarded to William H B Cotton for going to the help of the crew of the steamship Kendy.

Framed Letter of Thanks x 3 – 1968
Three Framed Letters of Thanks were awarded to L S Knipe, J Lock and R A Comley for assisting the sand dredger Steepholm in partnership with the Mumbles lifeboat.

Silver Medal – 1995
A Silver Medal was awarded to Stuart Roberts for rescuing a surfer and his board caught in a rip tide in winds gusting to force 9 on 30 December 1994.

Thanks of the Institution Inscribed on Vellum x 2 – 1995
Thanks of the Institution Inscribed on Vellums were awarded to Crew Members Carl Evans and Wayne Evans for their actions during a rescue involving a surfer and his board on 30 December 1994.

Framed Letter of Thanks – 1995
A Framed Letter of Thanks was awarded to the Station Honorary Secretary, Mr John Williams for his actions during a rescue involving a surfer and his board on 30 December 1994.

Framed Letter of Thanks x 2 – 1997
Two Framed Letters of Thanks were awarded to Helmsman Philip Missen and Crew Member Steve Jones for assisting two people cut off by the tide.

Framed Letter of Thanks x 2- 1998
Two Framed Letters of Thanks were awarded to Helmsman Philip Missen and Crew Member Ross Martin for rescuing a man clinging to his capsized boat.

Thanks of the Institution Inscribed on Vellum – 2002
The Thanks of the Institution Inscribed on Vellum was awarded to Helmsman Timothy Morgan for the rescue of a windsurfer.

Framed Letter of Thanks x 2 – 2002
A Framed Letter of Thanks was awarded to Crew Members Riccardo Rava and Carl Evans for the rescue of a windsurfer.

Bronze Medal – 2002
A Bronze Medal was awarded to Helmsman Nick Beale for rescuing two fisherman washed off the pier in sea conditions exceeding normal operating limits of an Atlantic 75 lifeboat.

Thanks of the Institution Inscribed on Vellum x 2 – 2002
Thanks of the Institution Inscribed on Vellums were awarded to crew members Riccardo Rava and Stephen Knipe for rescuing two fisherman washed off the pier in sea conditions exceeding normal operating limits of an Atlantic 75 lifeboat.

Framed Letter of Thanks – 2002
A Framed Letter of Thanks was awarded to Helmsman Stephen Jones for rescuing two fisherman washed off the pier in sea conditions exceeding normal operating limits of an Atlantic 75 lifeboat.

Bronze Medal – 2004
A Bronze Medal was awarded to Helmsman Aileen Jones when two people and the fishing vessel Gower Pride were saved near the Nash sandbank. Aileen was first female lifeboat helmsman in 116 years to be given such an accolade.

Thanks of the Institution Inscribed on Vellum – 2004
Crew Member Simon Emms was awarded the Thanks of the Institution Inscribed on Vellum for saving two people and the fishing vessel Gower Pride near the Nash Sandbank.

References

External links
The RNLI - Porthcawl RNLI page
Porthcawl RNLI Website

Lifeboat stations in Wales
Porthcawl
Transport infrastructure completed in 1860